MAXjet Airways was an American, transatlantic, all-business class airline that operated between 2003 and 2007. Its headquarters were located on the grounds of Washington-Dulles International Airport, and in the Dulles area of Loudoun County, Virginia, United States.

MAXjet operated services to London Stansted Airport, United Kingdom from Las Vegas McCarran International Airport, Los Angeles International Airport, and John F. Kennedy International Airport, New York.

From the beginning, MAXjet Airways may have been compromised by a lack of economies of scale, having only a maximum of 5 aircraft at the height of its operations, although this is similar to other competing airlines in this class (EOS, SilverJet  etc.). It offered passengers airport lounge access (flagship lounge at Stansted; shared, non-proprietary at JFK and LAX; not available in Las Vegas), premium complimentary meals and beverages and on-demand in-flight entertainment.

On 24 December 2007, the airline filed for Chapter 11 Bankruptcy and ceased operations. The airline confirmed that Eos Airlines was to accommodate passengers on their Stansted to JFK services.

History
 

The airline was publicly traded on the London Stock Exchange Alternative Investment Market as "MAXJ". It operated its first service from New York to London on 1 November 2005. Founded in 2003, the airline was conceived as a transatlantic low-cost carrier that would code share with domestic low-cost carriers at Baltimore-Washington International Thurgood Marshall Airport. During its start-up phase, management expressed concern over the economics of applying the low cost carrier model to transatlantic routes and instead repositioned the airline as a premium all-business-class service. MAXjet's target market was premium economy and "savvy" business class passengers.

The success of MAXjet’s all-business-class service continued to grow as the company claimed load factors of 83.1% (June 2007) on its network from London Stansted.

As well as the scheduled routes, MAXjet’s luxury charter operations continued to grow with the acquisition of more aircraft. Some aircraft were planned to focus on the growing charter business as well as being used as support on the New York City, Los Angeles and Las Vegas scheduled routes. The airline’s luxury charter business, which experienced significant growth, transported groups to various destinations throughout Europe, the Caribbean and the USA. Charters included Stockholm to Las Vegas, and England to Washington D.C. and Los Angeles including a charter for the 2006 U.S Ryder Cup team. The company had a strong customer base that included corporations, government entities and professional sports teams.

Suspension of MAXjet shares and filing for bankruptcy

On 7 December 2007, MAXjet suspended trading of its shares on AIM, pending clarification of their financial position.

An article in the Financial Times on 23 December 2007 reported that the company was in "last-ditch talks" to arrange a financial rescue package. 
However, the following morning the company announced on its website that it had filed for Chapter 11 bankruptcy. Passengers who had yet to travel were advised to seek a refund from the point of purchase. The company announced it had already begun to make alternative travel or accommodation arrangements for those left stranded.

On 24 December 2007, MAXjet announced that they permanently suspended all flight operations citing rising fuel costs, increased crew salaries, and other unforeseen costs. The airline purchased tickets to accommodate passengers on Eos Airlines, and Continental Airlines and Silverjet both made offers to accommodate stranded MAXjet passengers.

On March 25, 2008, MAXjet announced that operations will soon start again following an acquisition by NCA Sports Group to restart its operation as a charter service. However that failed in August 2008.

Destinations 

The following destinations were operated by MAXjet during its existence.

Europe

United Kingdom
London (London Stansted Airport)

North America

United States
California
Los Angeles (Los Angeles International Airport)
Nevada
Las Vegas (McCarran International Airport)
New York City
New York City (John F. Kennedy International Airport)
Washington, DC
Sterling, Virginia (Washington Dulles International Airport) (ended before ceasing operations)

Fleet 
The MAXjet Airways fleet consisted of the following aircraft as of December 2007:

1 Boeing 767-200
4 Boeing 767-200ER

MAXjet's aircraft were configured with either 92, 94, 100, or 102 seats depending on the individual aircraft, with an average fleet age of 18.2 years as of March 2007.

In-flight services 

MAXjet aircraft were fitted with traditional leather business-class "deep-recline" cradle-seats with a 60-inch seat pitch (distance between a seat and the same point on the seat in front of it) and a 160-degree recline.

On-demand entertainment, which included 100 hours of movies, television programs and music videos as well as pure music audio content, was available via individual portable media players called "MAXplayers", which were provided on each flight. Although the seats were new, MAXjet aircraft had a relatively old style cabin fit, so the seats were not equipped with conventional built-in entertainment systems or in-flight A/C power ports.

The airline's catering used restaurant china, metal cutlery and stemmed glassware, and offered complimentary premium liquor, beer, champagne and a regularly changing wine selection.

Awards 
Travel + Leisure Magazine's Top 10 International Airlines 2007 - 2nd place

See also 

 PrivatAir
 Eos Airlines
 Silverjet
 L'Avion (now OpenSkies after being purchased by British Airways)
 Indigo Airlines
 La Compagnie (founded by the founder of L'Avion)
 List of defunct airlines of the United States

References

External links 

MAXjet Archives
MAXjet Airways
MAXjet In-Flight Meal Photos
MAXjet Airways Fleet Age
MAXjet Airways Fleet Detail

Defunct airlines of the United States
Airlines established in 2003
Airlines disestablished in 2007
Companies based in Dulles, Virginia
Defunct companies based in Virginia
Companies formerly listed on the Alternative Investment Market
2003 establishments in Virginia
Business class airlines
2007 disestablishments in Virginia
Companies that filed for Chapter 11 bankruptcy in 2007